Peng Xiaoming (born 15 May 1975) is a retired female pole vaulter from PR China. Her personal best jump is 4.15 metres, achieved in October 1997 in Shanghai.

Achievements

References

1975 births
Living people
Chinese female pole vaulters
Place of birth missing (living people)
20th-century Chinese women